Tephritis michiganensis is a species of fruit fly in the family Tephritidae.

Distribution
Canada, USA.

References

Tephritinae
Insects described in 1951
Diptera of North America